Hodgeman County (county code HG) is a county located in the U.S. state of Kansas. As of the 2020 census, the county population was 1,723. Its county seat and most populous city is Jetmore.

History
Hodgeman County was founded in 1867. It was named for Amos Hodgman, member of the 7th Regiment Kansas Volunteer Cavalry. The letter E was later added to the namesake's name.

Geography

Adjacent counties
 Ness County (north)
 Pawnee County (east)
 Edwards County (southeast)
 Ford County (south)
 Gray County (southwest)
 Finney County (west)

Demographics

As of the census of 2000, there were 2,085 people, 796 households, and 581 families residing in the county.  The population density was 2 people per square mile (1/km2).  There were 945 housing units at an average density of 1 per square mile (0/km2).  The racial makeup of the county was 97.31% White, 0.91% Black or African American, 0.24% Native American, 0.48% from other races, and 1.06% from two or more races. Hispanic or Latino of any race were 2.69% of the population.

There were 796 households, out of which 34.70% had children under the age of 18 living with them, 65.10% were married couples living together, 4.40% had a female householder with no husband present, and 27.00% were non-families. 24.70% of all households were made up of individuals, and 14.20% had someone living alone who was 65 years of age or older.  The average household size was 2.58 and the average family size was 3.09.

In the county, the population was spread out, with 29.00% under the age of 18, 4.70% from 18 to 24, 25.20% from 25 to 44, 22.10% from 45 to 64, and 19.00% who were 65 years of age or older.  The median age was 40 years. For every 100 females there were 97.30 males.  For every 100 females age 18 and over, there were 96.90 males.

The median income for a household in the county was $35,994, and the median income for a family was $39,358. Males had a median income of $27,568 versus $21,534 for females. The per capita income for the county was $15,599.  About 10.70% of families and 11.50% of the population were below the poverty line, including 11.90% of those under age 18 and 7.70% of those age 65 or over.

Government

Presidential elections
Hodgeman County is a Republican stronghold. Only six Republican presidential candidates have failed to win the county from 1888 to the present, and no Democrat has to managed to win even a quarter of the county's votes since Michael Dukakis in 1988. The last Democrat to carry the county was Jimmy Carter in 1976.

Laws
Following amendment to the Kansas Constitution in 1986, the county remained an alcohol-free, or "dry", county until 2004, when voters approved the sale of alcoholic beverages by the individual drink with a 30% food sales requirement.

Education

Unified school districts
 Jetmore USD 227

Communities

Cities
 Hanston
 Jetmore

Townships
Hodgeman County is divided into nine townships.  None of the cities within the county are considered governmentally independent, and all figures for the townships include those of the cities.  In the following table, the population center is the largest city (or cities) included in that township's population total, if it is of a significant size.

In popular culture
At the beginning of the 1992 film Unforgiven, the protagonist William Munny, played by Clint Eastwood, is living in Hodgeman County and working as a pig farmer, while attempting to hide evidence of his violent past from all those around him.

See also

References

Notes

Further reading

 Handbook of Hodgeman County, Kansas; C.S. Burch Publishing Co; 34 pages; 1887.
 Standard Atlas of Hodgeman County, Kansas; Geo. A. Ogle & Co; 56 pages; 1907.

External links

County
 
 Hodgeman County - Directory of Public Officials
Maps
 Hodgeman County Maps: Current, Historic, KDOT
 Kansas Highway Maps: Current, Historic, KDOT
 Kansas Railroad Maps: Current, 1996, 1915, KDOT and Kansas Historical Society

 
Kansas counties
1867 establishments in Kansas
Populated places established in 1867